Anna of Pomerania (1492 – 25 April 1550) was a German Princess. She was a member of the House of Pomerania (also known as House of Greifen or House of Griffins) and by marriage Duchess of Brzeg.

She was the eldest daughter of Bogislaw X, Duke of Pomerania, by his second wife Anna, daughter of King Casimir IV of Poland.

Life
On 9 June 1516, Anna married with Duke George I of Brieg. The union, which lasted until George I's death in 1521, was childless. According to her husband's will, Anna received the Duchy of Lubin as her dower with full sovereignty over that land until her own death, twenty-nine years later, when Lubin reverted to the Duchy of Legnica.

References

1492 births
1550 deaths
German princesses